was a railway station on the Nemuro Main Line of JR Hokkaido located in Furano, Hokkaidō, Japan. The station opened on November 10, 1913. This station was permanently closed by the Hokkaido Railway Company (JR Hokkaido) on March 3, 2017

Railway stations in Hokkaido Prefecture
Stations of Hokkaido Railway Company
Railway stations in Japan opened in 1913
Railway stations closed in 2017